The Hollywood Erotic Museum was an adults-only museum located in a restored 1926 building on Hollywood Boulevard in Hollywood, California specializing in sexual history in Hollywood and the entertainment industry. The six thousand square foot space was also home to the Erotic Museum Hall of Fame, whose eight inductees included Hugh Hefner. It was established by Boris Smorodinsky and Mark Volper in 2004 and closed in mid-2006 due to lack of business and gentrification.

The museum featured many different items, including original etchings by Pablo Picasso as well as a legendary stag film dating back to 1948 that is allegedly of Marilyn Monroe having sex with an unnamed man. The video owned by the museum is the only known copy in existence. Also in their permanent collection, contemporary erotic art by such artists as Julian Murphy and Tom of Finland.

References

External links
The Erotic Museum

Museums disestablished in 2006
Defunct museums in California
Sex museums in the United States
History museums in Hollywood, Los Angeles
Museums established in 2004
2004 establishments in California
2006 disestablishments in California